"But Anyway" is a song by the jam band Blues Traveler, and the lead track on their 1990 eponymous debut album, Blues Traveler.  The song peaked at number 5 on the Adult Alternative Airplay chart on 12 July 1996, and at number 24 on the Billboard Mainstream Top 40 on 30 August 1996.

Music video
The music video features footage of Blues Traveler performing the song at different concert venues, switching between close-ups of band members and short clips from the 1996 comedy Kingpin, in which Blues Traveler performed "But Anyway" during the closing credits while dressed in traditional Amish clothing.

References

Blues Traveler songs
1990 songs